Per Anders Otto Bill (born 13 February 1958) is a Swedish politician of the Moderate Party who has been Governor of Gävleborg County since 1 August 2015. He was a member of the Riksdag from 1994 to 2015. Eisenhower Fellowships selected Per Bill in 1999 to represent Sweden. He is brother-in-law of Karin Enström, the former Minister for Defence.

References

Riksdagen: Per Bill (m)

Members of the Riksdag from the Moderate Party
Living people
1958 births
Members of the Riksdag 2002–2006